Asura mimetica is a moth of the family Erebidae. It was described by Walter Rothschild 1913 and is found on the Solomon Islands.

Subspecies
Asura mimetica mimetica (Solomon Islands)
Asura mimetica flagrans D. S. Fletcher, 1957 (Renell Island)

References

mimetica
Moths described in 1913
Taxa named by Walter Rothschild
Moths of Oceania